Buckingham River is a river in the Northern Territory of Australia.
 
The headwaters of the river are on the northern edge on the eastern side of the Mitchell Ranges near where the Central Arnhem Road crosses the Range. The river flows in a northerly direction though uninhabited country until it discharges into Buckingham Bay and the Arafura Sea.

The estuary formed at the river mouth is tidal in nature and in near pristine condition.

The traditional owners of the area are the Murngin also known as the Yolngu peoples.
The Aboriginal community of Gapuwiyak still has supplies taken by barge up the river to be delivered.

See also

List of rivers of Northern Territory

References

Rivers of the Northern Territory
Arnhem Land
Arafura Sea
Estuaries of the Northern Territory